Since the inception of the Trinidadian football league competition, the TT Pro League, in 1999, more than 100 players have scored three goals (hat-trick) or more in a single match. Twelve players have scored more than three goals in a match (beaver-trick), of these, Titus Elva holds the Pro League record for most goals in a single match with nine.

The fixture between W Connection and Tobago United at Ato Boldon Stadium in 2004 saw five hat-tricks during the match from Titus Elva (3), Dwayne Ellis, and Jose Luciano Viera for the Savonetta Boys. In 2009, Defence Force's Richard Roy and Jabloteh's Noel Williams both scored beaver-tricks in a match that the San Juan Kings won 5–4. Only six players, Jason Scotland, Anthony Wolfe, Keyon Edwards, Devorn Jorsling, Marcus Joseph, and Jerwyn Balthazar have scored hat-tricks in two consecutive league games.

Devorn Jorsling have scored three or more goals on nine occasions in the Pro League with four during the 2014–15 season — more than any other Pro League player in a season. Kerry Baptiste has the second most number of hat-tricks with eight, which is followed by Keyon Edwards and Anthony Wolfe with four hat-tricks each. In addition, Kerry Baptiste, Titus Elva, and Jerren Nixon have scored four or more goals twice in the Pro League. Two players have each scored hat-tricks for three clubs: Peter Prospar (South Starworld Strikers, San Juan Jabloteh, and United Petrotrin) and Anthony Wolfe (San Juan Jabloteh, Ma Pau, and North East Stars).

During the 2009 season witnessed the most hat-tricks (16) than any other Pro League season from twelve players. In addition, there were also five players that scored four or more goals in a match during the season.

Hat-tricks

Multiple hat-tricks
The following table lists the minimum number of hat-tricks scored by players who have scored two or more hat-tricks. The table also features the minimum number of beaver-tricks, four or more goals scored in a match, by each player listed with multiple hat-tricks.

See also
 Top TT Pro League goal scorers by season
 TT Pro League Golden Boot

References

External links
Official Website
Soca Warriors Online, TT Pro League

hat
TT Pro League
Association football player non-biographical articles